Olena Ivanivna Stepaniv (7 December 1892 – 11 July 1963; also Olena Iwaniwna Stepaniw, Yelena Ivanovna Stepaniv, and Olena Stepaniw-Daschkewytsch) was an Austro-Hungarian and Ukrainian soldier, public figure and economist. She is popularly known as the first female officer in the Ukrainian army.

Life 
Stepaniv was born in Vyshnivchyk, Austria-Hungary (now Ukraine) in 1892. In 1912, she attended a meeting organised by Konstantyna Malytska for the "Women's Committee" in Lviv to prepare for war. Others at the meeting were Olena Zalizniak, Maria Biletska and Olha Basarab. They recommended that the money raised from the "National Combat Fund" be used to fund the Ukrainian Sich Riflemen. 

During the First World War she was a student at Lviv University. While still a student she was given the command of a platoon. She claimed that she joined the Ukrainian Sich Riflemen by dressing as a man. Her disguise was spotted and it was debated as to whether she should be detained; she was saved when Volodymyr Starosolsky intervened and persuaded the recruiters to enroll her. Some of these details changed when she retold the story. It has been estimated that only 34 Ukrainian women made it to the front including Stepaniv and her friend Hanna Dmyterko.
  
Stepaniv was also present at the battle for Makivka with the Legion of Ukrainian Sich Riflemen and was rewarded by being promoted to second lieutenant and awarded a medal for bravery. She became the best-known female Ukrainian soldier. The women soldiers were reported on internationally, and postcards of them were distributed, but it was Stepaniv who gained the greatest profile. Ferenc Molnár, a journalist and playwright, reported seeing women sharp shooters serving alongside men, wearing uniforms and gaining medals and promotions. According to one source, Stepaniv, Sofia Halechko and Iryna Kuz were the first women to fight on equal terms with men in the 20th century, but another source cites other examples.

Stepaniv was taken prisoner by the Russians after she, and others, stayed behind to cover a retreat at Bolekhiv. She was held in Tashkent as a prisoner of war, where she stayed until 1917. She helped organise the 1918 uprising in Tashkent, as she was a member of the legion's Supreme Military Board. From 1918 to 1919 she again commanded a platoon, this time in the Ukrainian Galician Army, the military force of the West Ukrainian People's Republic.

When the war was over, Stepaniv returned to education and gained a doctorate. In 1927, she attended the 2nd Congress of Ukrainian natural scientists and physicians. In 1930, she published a book recording the years 1912–14. This was one of the 75 publications she made during her life.

Stepaniv began teaching at a gymnasium established by the Basilian sisters in Lviv; she remained there until 1935, when the Polish leaders of the order stopped her teaching. She then took a job with the Ridna Shkola society, which had championed the Ukrainian language since 1881. She also worked for the Audit Union of Ukrainian Co-operatives and was a well-known personality.

In 1942, Stepaniv led the statistics department in Lviv. She gathered and published data and it was said that the publications were intended to embarrass the country's occupiers. During the war she was working at Lviv University but after the war ended she was sent to a labour camp in Mordovia in 1949, because of her Ukrainian patriotism. She was held there until 1956.

Private life
Stepaniv married Roman Dashkevych, who was a lawyer and a general-khorunzhyi (general-ensign) of the Ukrainian People's Army. In 1926, their son, Yaroslav Dashkevych, was born.

Death and legacy
Stepaniv died in Lviv in 1963. Fictionalized biographies of her exist.

In 1991, a street in Lviv, Oleny Stepanivny Street, was renamed after her, citing her as the first woman to become a commissioned officer in the Ukrainian army.

In October 2002 the Yelizaveta Chaikina street in Ukraine's capital Kyiv was renamed to Olena Stepaniv street.

References 

1892 births
1963 deaths
20th-century Ukrainian historians
20th-century Ukrainian women writers
People from Ternopil Oblast
Ukrainian Galician Army people
Ukrainian women historians
Ukrainian women in World War I